Palaeoloxodon namadicus or the Asian straight-tusked elephant, is an extinct species of prehistoric elephant known from the early Middle to Late Pleistocene of the Indian subcontinent, and possibly also elsewhere in Asia.

Some authorities historically regarded it to be a subspecies of Palaeoloxodon antiquus, the European straight-tusked elephant, due to extreme similarities of the tusks. P. namadicus shares similarities to other species Palaeoloxodon, which includes a large crest (the parieto-occipital crest) at the top of the skull that anchored the splenius muscles used to support the head. Later research suggested that P. namadicus can be distinguished from P. antiquus by its less robust limb bones and more stout cranium (including a better developed parieto-occipital crest).

Based on the stable isotope ratios of carbon and oxygen and the morphology of their teeth, it is suggested that P. namadicus tended towards a grazing diet, as opposed to the sympatric Stegodon and Elephas species, which tended more towards browsing.

The oldest specimens of P. namadicus in India are thought to be over 700,000 years old, dating to the early Middle Pleistocene. Palaeoloxodon namadicus is thought to have become extinct during the Late Pleistocene, making it one of four megafaunal species native to India known to have become extinct during the Late Pleistocene, alongside fellow proboscidean Stegodon namadicus, the equine Equus namadicus, and a species of hippopotamus belonging to the genus Hexaprotodon. A late record of approximately 56,000 years Before Present is known from the banks of the Dhasan River on the Ganga plain in Uttar Pradesh. In 2015, a study based on extensive research of fragmentary leg bone fossils suggested that P. namadicus may have been the largest land mammal ever, but this requires reexamination.

Remains attributed to P. namadicus have also been reported across Southeast Asia (including Malaysia, Myanmar, Laos, and Vietnam, and the island of Sulawesi in Indonesia) and as well as southern China. However, the status of Chinese Palaeoloxodon is unresolved, with other authors considering the remains to belong to P. naumanni (otherwise known from Japan) or the separate species P. huaihoensis. The postcranial remains of Palaeoloxodon from China are substantially more robust than Indian P. namadicus  and in many respects are more similar to those of P. antiquus, making their referral to P. namadicus questionable.

Size

Several studies have attempted to estimate the size of the Asian straight-tusked elephants, as well as other prehistoric proboscideans, usually using comparisons of thigh bone length and knowledge of relative growth rates to estimate the size of incomplete skeletons.

Two partial thigh bones were found in the 19th century and would have measured 160 cm (5.2 ft) when complete. However this estimate based on the "distal femur portion" requires reexamination, as the author himself could only suspect that "fossils are likely stored in the Indian Museum of Kolkata; until such a collection can be revised, this size estimate will remain speculative."

References

Palaeoloxodon
Pleistocene proboscideans
Pleistocene mammals of Asia
Taxa named by Hugh Falconer
Fossil taxa described in 1846